Squirrel Creek may refer to:

Squirrel Creek, California
a watercourse in Spitler Woods State Natural Area
Squirrel Creek (Reedy Fork tributary), a stream in Guilford County, North Carolina
Squirrel Creek (Banister River tributary), a stream in Pittsylvania County, Virginia